The thirty-fourth season of Saturday Night Live, an American sketch comedy series, originally aired in the United States on NBC between September 13, 2008, and May 16, 2009.

This season is notable for its take on the 2008 presidential election, which saw the show's ratings rapidly increase and a number of award nominations.

History
This season consisted of 22 episodes rather than the usual 20, in an attempt to compensate for episodes lost during the 2007–2008 Writers Guild of America strike. This made it the longest season since the show's second season. The season premiere date of September 13 was earlier than the premiere date for previous seasons, which typically have started during the final weekend of September or in early October.

The show was nominated for many awards including Emmy Awards, a Peabody award and nomination for Comedy/Variety (Including Talk) Series at the Writers Guild of America Awards 2009. After gaining so much media coverage and high seasonal ratings, rival sketch show Mad TV ended in 2009 after its fourteenth season due to low ratings and a dip in quality brought on by budget constraints and mediocre writing (though MADtv would later return in 2016, it would only be for a brief, eight-episode run and the ratings were not enough for the show to be completely brought back from cancellation).

Election
SNL received much media coverage for the show's take on the 2008 presidential election, causing ratings to increase rapidly. The season premiere opened with Tina Fey playing Republican vice-presidential nominee Sarah Palin (alongside a pregnant Amy Poehler as Hillary Clinton) in a "non-partisan message on sexism". The phrase "I can see Russia from my house!" was coined by SNL producer Mike Shoemaker during this sketch. The episode was the show's highest-rated season premiere since the 2001–02 season and is the second most-watched SNL episode ever. A month later, the show drew its highest ratings in over 14 years when the real Sarah Palin appeared. SNL had 17 million viewers during its first half-hour.

Cast
Before the start of the season, the cast remained mostly unchanged except for the addition of Bobby Moynihan. Moynihan (like Casey Wilson in the previous season) came to SNL as a performer with the Upright Citizens Brigade Theater; during season 33, Moynihan and Wilson were among the group of Upright Citizens Brigade performers SNL auditioned mid-season while the show was looking for a new cast member to join after the writers' strike in early 2008, as longtime cast member Maya Rudolph left during the strike, due in part to her seven-year contract with SNL expiring during that year. While Wilson made her season 33 audition, Moynihan did not, but instead ended up being invited back for another audition shortly before this season started. Wilson remained a featured player for this season.

Midway through the season, longtime cast member Amy Poehler went on maternity leave after giving birth to her son hours before the October 25, 2008 episode, hosted by Jon Hamm. Poehler returned on December 6, 2008 in the John Malkovich hosted episode and made her final appearance as a cast member the following week on the Hugh Laurie hosted episode on December 13, 2008. She announced that it would be her final show at the end of Weekend Update, leaving Poehler to become the longest serving female cast member at the time, as she surpassed Molly Shannon and Rachel Dratch's record after staying for eight seasons. Poehler's record would be surpassed eleven years later by Kate McKinnon, who joined the show during the final five episodes of season 37, with her eventual tenure extending across nine seasons.

Shortly after Poehler went on maternity leave, the show added two new female cast members to fill the void. Abby Elliott (daughter of former SNL cast member Chris Elliott) and Michaela Watkins, a performer with The Groundlings in Los Angeles, joined the show as featured players on November 15, 2008. Watkins, like Moynihan, had originally auditioned in season 33, not earning a spot with the cast for that season, but being invited back for another audition the next season.

This season would also be the last for longtime cast member Darrell Hammond, the last remaining cast member from the 1990s, who had been on the show for 14 seasons. He was the longest-running cast member until Kenan Thompson surpassed him in 2017. Hammond would eventually return to SNL, making multiple cameo appearances in sketches, until he succeeded longtime announcer Don Pardo in 2014, after Pardo died a month before the 40th season began. Following Hammond's departure, featured players Michaela Watkins and Casey Wilson were both let go after the season's finale.

Cast roster

Repertory players
Fred Armisen
Will Forte
Bill Hader
Darrell Hammond
Seth Meyers
Amy Poehler (final episode: December 13, 2008)
Andy Samberg
Jason Sudeikis
Kenan Thompson
Kristen Wiig

Featured players
Abby Elliott (first episode: November 15, 2008)
Bobby Moynihan
Michaela Watkins (first episode: November 15, 2008)
Casey Wilson

bold denotes Weekend Update anchor

Writers

Episodes

Specials

References

34
Saturday Night Live in the 2000s
2008 American television seasons
2009 American television seasons
Television shows directed by Don Roy King